Inotodiol is an anti-inflammatory sterol isolated from Inonotus obliquus.

References

Sterols